was a renowned Japanese amateur photographer, particularly in the 1930s.

 was born in Kumagaya, Saitama on 1 November 1911. From the age of thirteen Satō had a Thornton reflex camera; on his graduation from school he took photographs in his free time from his work in a bicycle wholesaler. He was given the nom de guerre  when young.

From 1931 his photographs appeared in Camera and Shashin Geppō, and from 1933 in Shashin Salon. Satō's works were selected for the Golden Gate International Exposition in 1940.

An energetic and widely exhibited portraitist before and during the war, Satō turned his camera to his parents and his children after the war.

Satō died of tuberculosis on 30 May 1955.

Some of Satō's photographs are in the permanent collection of the Tokyo Metropolitan Museum of Photography, the Houston Museum of Fine Arts, and Shimane Art Museum.

Published photographs

Nihon kindai shashin no seiritsu to tenkai / The Founding and Development of Modern Photography in Japan. Tokyo: Tokyo Museum of Photography, 1995. Plate 122: "Man in black cape" (Kuromanto no otoko), 1937.
Satō Kōji no shashin / The Photographs of Koji Sato. N.p.: Kenji Satō, 2001. Captions and text in Japanese and English.

Notes

References
 Kaneko Ryūichi. "Satō Kōji". Nihon shashinka jiten / 328 Outstanding Japanese Photographers. Kyoto: Tankōsha, 2000. . Despite the English-language alternative title, all in Japanese. P. 155.
 Nihon no shashinka / Biographic Dictionary of Japanese Photography. Tokyo: Nichigai Associates, 2005. . Despite the English-language alternative title, all in Japanese. Pp. 196–7.

Japanese photographers
Portrait photographers
1911 births
1955 deaths
Artists from Saitama Prefecture
20th-century deaths from tuberculosis
Tuberculosis deaths in Japan